Samuel Joseph Schweig, in Israel known as Shmuel Yosef Schweig (1905 in Tarnopol, Austria-Hungary – 19 March 1985 in Jerusalem, Israel) was an Israeli photographer.

Biography

Early life in Europe
Shmuel Joseph Schweig (S.J. Schweig) was a photographer born in 1905 in Galicia, then part of the Austro-Hungarian Empire. He showed interest in photography still while in Tarnopol and later studied it in Vienna.

In Mandate Palestine and Israel
His Zionist convictions made him emigrate to the Land of Israel, then Mandate Palestine, already in 1922. Here he started his career photographing sites and landscapes of the country. Between 1925 and 1927 Schweig worked as a photographer for the JNF. In 1927 he established a workshop in Hanevi'im (Prophets) Street in Jerusalem. The first color photographs taken by a local photographer in Palestine were done by Schweig.

After specialising in archaeological photography, he became the chief photographer of the Department of Antiquities of the Mandatory administration, housed from 1938 onward by the Palestine Archaeological Museum, a.k.a. the Rockefeller Museum.

Beginning in the 1920s, his photographs helped shape the world's perception of the Zionist enterprise. But Shmuel Joseph Schweig is equally renowned as Israel's first artistic photographer of landscape and archaeology. Schweig is considered one of the most important of those who fashioned the image of Palestine, beginning in the 1920s, and he is identified with the Zionist enterprise and the nation-building project of the Jewish people. However, he saw himself above all as an artistic photographer; indeed, he is considered the first local art photographer of landscape and archaeology.

Some of the early photographs of the Great Isaiah scroll – one of the Dead Sea Scrolls – was taken by Schweig.

Book publications
He worked at several archaeological publications and was in charge of the illustration and layout of the Encyclopedia of Archaeological Excavations in the Holy Land (editor Michael Avi-Yonah, Prentice-Hall, 1978).

Schweig produced at the request of the office of the Secretary of State for the Colonies an album of Tegart forts known as "The Police Stations Plan 1940–1941", "The Wilson Brown Buildings" or "From Dan to Be'er Sheva".

Museums and archives
The Schweig collection, which includes both glass and large gelatin negatives, is divided among the Israel Museum, the archive of the JNF, the Central Zionist Archives and the Rockefeller Museum. Many original prints, mostly small in size, are held by private collectors.

Education
 1921 Photography, Vienna and London
 1930 London University, languages, and Photography School, London

Titles, awards and prizes 
 1976 Honorary Fellow of the Royal Photographic Society of Great Britain
 1977 Yakir Yerushalayim – "Worthy Citizen of Jerusalem"
 1978 Enrique Kavlin Photography Prize, Israel Museum, Jerusalem, Israel
 Member of the Council of the Israel Exploration Society

Selected exhibitions
The Open Museum for Photography, Tel Hai.
1971: a solo exhibition at the Israel Museum, Jerusalem
1985: second exhibition at the Israel Museum, Jerusalem
2010: "Shmuel Joseph Schweig: Photography as Material", at the Open Museum of Photography in the Tel Hai Industrial Park

Articles 
 Niche, 1 June 2010 (Hebrew)
 Masa Aher, 1 August 2010 (Hebrew)
 HA'ARETZ – GUIDE, 6 August 2010 (Hebrew)
 Yediyot Haifa, 3 September 2010 (Hebrew)

Further reading
 
 Perez, Nissan (ed), Camera Sacra, The Israel Museum, 2005

External links

See also
 Ze'ev Aleksandrowicz (1905–1992), Polish-born photographer, active in Mandate Palestine between 1932 and 1935
 Zoltan Kluger (1896–1977), important photographer in pre-state Israel
 David Rubinger (1924–2017), Israeli photographer, author of photo of paratroopers at the Western Wall in Six-Day War
 :de:Herbert Sonnenfeld (1906–1972), German Jewish photographer, husband of Leni, photographed in Mandate Palestine in the 1930s
 Leni Sonnenfeld (1907–2004), German Jewish photographer, wife of Herbert, photographed Israel in the early years of its existence
 Rudi Weissenstein (1910–1999), Israeli photographer, author of iconic Declaration of Independence picture

References

Israeli photographers
1905 births
1984 deaths
Artists from Ternopil
Archaeological photographers
Early photographers in Palestine
Jews from Galicia (Eastern Europe)
Polish emigrants to Mandatory Palestine